Benjamin Arthur Challenger (born 7 March 1978) is a retired English high jumper. His personal best jump of 2.30 metres was achieved when he won the 1999 Summer Universiade. His career highlight is a silver medal at the 1998 Commonwealth Games.

Born in Loughborough, Leicestershire, Challenger attended Shepshed High School and later he studied sports science at Loughborough University (a course he later abandoned in favour of full-time high jump training). As a youth he considered a career in basketball, and toured the US with the Leicester Riders, leading to offers from NBA talent scouts acting for US universities, which he turned down.

He is the son of the Showaddywaddy drummer, Romeo Challenger, and the brother of singer  Tamzin Challenger.

Challenger is married to recruitment consultant and fitness instructor Lucy. Together they run Studio Challenger in Berkshire, a pilates school.

Competition record

References

External links

1978 births
Living people
Alumni of Loughborough University
Athletes (track and field) at the 1998 Commonwealth Games
Athletes (track and field) at the 2000 Summer Olympics
Athletes (track and field) at the 2002 Commonwealth Games
Athletes (track and field) at the 2006 Commonwealth Games
Commonwealth Games bronze medallists for England
Commonwealth Games medallists in athletics
Commonwealth Games silver medallists for England
English male high jumpers
English sportspeople of Antigua and Barbuda descent
Medalists at the 1999 Summer Universiade
Olympic athletes of Great Britain
Sportspeople from Loughborough
Universiade gold medalists for Great Britain
Universiade medalists in athletics (track and field)
Medallists at the 1998 Commonwealth Games
Medallists at the 2002 Commonwealth Games